The following is a chronological list of telenovelas produced by SIC:

2000s

2010s

2020s

See also
 Sociedade Independente de Comunicação

References

SIC
 
SIC telenovelas